Harry Taylor  (born 1930), was an England international lawn bowler.

Bowls career
He became an international for England when he was capped in 1973.

He represented England in the fours event, at the 1974 British Commonwealth Games in Christchurch, New Zealand.

In 1971 and 1977 he was the Northumberland singles county champion. In addition he won two county pairs and one triples title.

References

1930 births
English male bowls players
Bowls players at the 1974 British Commonwealth Games
Living people
Commonwealth Games competitors for England